Marília is a Brazilian municipality in the state of São Paulo.

Marília or Marilia may also refer to:

People
First name

 Marilia Andrés Casares (born 1974), Spanish singer-songwriter
 Marília Gabriela (born 1948), Brazilian journalist, actress, singer, television presenter and writer
 Marilia Gomes (born 1982), Brazilian artistic gymnast
 Marília Mendonça (1995-2021), Brazilian singer and composer
 Marília Pêra (1943–2015), Brazilian actress
 Marilia Rocha (born 1978), Brazilian filmmaker

Nickname

 Reginaldo de Santana (born 1975), better known as Marilia, Brazilian footballer

Sports clubs
 Marília Atlético Clube, Brazilian football club
 Marília Futebol Clube, Brazilian football club

Other uses
 Marilia (insect), an insect genus
 Marília Airport, Brazilian airport
 Marília de Dirceu, poetry book by Tomás António Gonzaga
 Marília Formation, geological formation in Brazil
 Diário de Marília, Brazilian newspaper
 TAM Aviação Executiva (Táxi Aéreo Marília), Brazilian airline